Ceylalictus cereus is a species of bee in the genus Ceylalictus, of the family Halictidae.

References
 http://animaldiversity.org/accounts/Ceylalictus_cereus/classification/
 https://www.itis.gov/servlet/SingleRpt/SingleRpt?search_topic=TSN&search_value=757410
 http://www.atlashymenoptera.net/page.asp?id=94
 https://www.gbif.org/species/1352666
 

Halictidae
Hymenoptera of Asia
Insects of Sri Lanka
Insects described in 1902